Fort Daniel Conservation Area is a 200-acre (0.8 km²) park located 4 miles (6.5 km) east of Mount Zion, Illinois.  The land preserve protects the site of a ghost town, Whistleville.  Today, the site centers on hiking and picknicking in the Big Creek watershed southeast of Decatur.

Five marked trails comprise 4.5 miles (7.0 km) of hiking opportunities that cross and recross Big Creek.  At the north end of the conservation area, a recreational complex includes a picnic shelter, playground, and fire ring.  Tree watchers are encouraged to find and identify the sugar maples, chinquapin oaks, pawpaw, wafer ash, and Kentucky coffeetrees that grow in the conservation area.  The conservation area is maintained by the Macon County Conservation District.

In August 2022, a private-sector donor awarded a $2.9 million grant to the MCCD to enable a 236-acre land acquisition adjacent to the existing Area.  The grant will roughly double the size of the Area.

The nearest major highway is Illinois Route 121, southeast of Decatur.

Whistleville
Although the Big Creek upper watershed is open space now, it was one of the first points settled by Euro-Americans in the 1820s in what became Macon County.  Looking for wooded land and firewood on the unforested prairie, the settlers found mature oaks and hickories here.  The first comers named their pioneer village Whistleville.  Soon a stagecoach route made the settlement a port of call between Indiana and Central Illinois.  Early settlers were mostly from the American South, and the settlement was identified as a location of Southern sympathizers during the American Civil War.  After the Civil War, Whistleville dwindled and disappeared into ghost town status.

References

External links
Official website

Ghost towns in Illinois  
Protected areas of Macon County, Illinois
Tourist attractions in Macon County, Illinois